Thủ Thừa is a rural district of Long An province in the Mekong Delta region of Vietnam. As of 2003 the district had a population of 88,455. The district covers an area of 489 km2. The district capital lies at Thủ Thừa.

Divisions
The district is divided into one urban municipality and 12 communes:

Thủ Thừa (urban), Long Thành, Long Thuận, Mỹ Lạc, Mỹ Thạnh, Mỹ An, Mỹ Phú, Tân Thành, Bình An, Bình Thạnh, Nhị Thành, Long Thành and Tân Lập.

References

Districts of Long An province